Miguel Gutiérrez may refer to:

Arts and entertainment
Miguel Gutiérrez (writer) (1940–2016), Peruvian novelist
Miguel Gutierrez (choreographer) (born 1971), American dancer and choreographer

Sportspeople

Association football
Miguel Gutiérrez (footballer, 1931–2016), Mexican football forward
Miguel Gutiérrez (footballer, born 1956), Peruvian football midfielder
Miguel Gutiérrez (footballer, born 2001), Spanish football left-back

Other sports
Miguel Gutiérrez (cyclist) (born 1954), Spanish cyclist
Miguel Gutiérrez (volleyball) (born 1997), Cuban volleyball player